Joy Selig (fl. 1988–1991) is a former gymnast who was inducted into the Oregon State University Sports Hall of Fame in 1997 and the Oregon Sports Hall of Fame in 2010. She specialised in the balance beam and floor exercise.

See also
 Joy Selig (sculpture)

References

External links
 Legends of OSU Gymnastics Oral History Interviews

Living people
Year of birth missing (living people)
Oregon State Beavers women's gymnasts